Wild Cove is a local service district and designated place in the Canadian province of Newfoundland and Labrador. It is on the Baie Verte Peninsula of the island of Newfoundland.

Geography 
Wild Cove, White Bay is on the island of Newfoundland within Subdivision A of Division No. 8. It is located on the western side of the peninsula along the hilly coastline of White Bay.

Demographics 

Government 
Wild Cove, White Bay is a local service district (LSD) that is governed by a committee responsible for the provision of certain services to the community. The chair of the LSD committee is Larry Pinksen.

Transportation 
Roadway access to the rest of Newfoundland is provided by Route 419 (Wild Cove Road).

See also 
List of communities in Newfoundland and Labrador
List of designated places in Newfoundland and Labrador
List of local service districts in Newfoundland and Labrador

References 

Designated places in Newfoundland and Labrador
Local service districts in Newfoundland and Labrador